Kazarman is the village and capital of Toguz-Toro District, Jalal-Abad Region, Kyrgyzstan on the river Naryn. Its population was 11,191 in 2021.

One source says that "this poor dust-blown settlement in northern Jalal-Abad Region has something of the sinister reputation of a tough mining town down on its luck". The Makmal open-pit gold mine just to the south no longer provides employment opportunities. The town is largely cut off in winter when the roads are closed by snow.  There is a small airport Kazarman Airport, but it currently (2012) is served by no flights. The road southwest to Jalal-Abad city normally requires a 4x4 as far as the Kaldama Pass over the Ferghana range. Once over the pass the country opens out to the Ferghana Valley. The road east through Baetov and Dostuk to Naryn is somewhat better.

The village is a base for visiting Saimaluu Tash.

Population

See also
Karabulun Hydro Power Plant

References

Populated places in Jalal-Abad Region